Gordon Daniel Conant  (January 11, 1885 – January 2, 1953) was a Canadian lawyer, politician, and the 12th premier of Ontario, from 1942 to 1943.

Personal life
Born in Cedar Dale, East Whitby Township (now part of the City of Oshawa) in Ontario, Conant was a member of one of Oshawa's early European families. He was educated at the University of Toronto and Osgoode Hall Law School, and was called to the Ontario Bar in 1912. He practiced law in Oshawa. In 1913 he married Verna Conant (née Smith), daughter of E. D. Smith. Together they had three children. Outside politics, Conant served as president of Oshawa General Hospital, Oshawa Chamber of Commerce, Rotary Club and South Ontario Canadian Club. In 1933, he was made a King's Counsel. From 1943 to 1951, he was a Master of the Supreme Court of Ontario. In 1944, he was awarded an honorary degree from the University of Toronto. Conant died on January 2, 1953.

Municipal politics
In 1914, he was Deputy Reeve of Oshawa and Reeve in 1915. In 1916–1917, Conant became the youngest Mayor of Oshawa. After his office he dedicated himself to the development of hydro-electric power in Ontario. Due to his efforts, Ontario gained controlled of its own electrical system. In 1934, he became Crown Attorney for Ontario County.

Provincial politics
In 1937 elections, he was elected to the Legislative Assembly of Ontario representing the electoral district of Ontario. A Liberal, he was appointed Attorney-General of Ontario in 1937 in the government of Mitchell Hepburn.

Hepburn resigned suddenly, in October 1942, after a long series of erratic acts and especially due to his feud with Prime Minister William Lyon Mackenzie King that split Hepburn's cabinet and threatened the unity of his party. Hepburn announced that he was remaining leader of the party and Conant was selected as the new Premier by the Lieutenant Governor. The party, led by King's supporters, demanded a leadership convention and Conant and Hepburn were forced to acquiesce. Conant ran for the leadership but collapsed hours before the leadership vote and withdrew his candidacy.  Former Provincial Secretary and Registrar Harry Nixon was elected new Liberal leader and was thus appointed Premier in May 1943.

Commemorations
"Conant Street" in the Cedardale area of Oshawa is named after his family, as was the Conant Public School (now closed). Two other streets in the same neighbourhood were also named after him, "Gordon Street" and "Daniel Street".

On July 20, 1966, the Ontario Archaeological and Historic Sites Board unveiled a blue and gold plaque in Lakeview Park. On August 14, 1966, the plaque was stolen and a week later was found in 26 feet of water at the Oshawa Harbour by local diver Robert Stevenson. The plaque was later moved closer to Henry House (one-third of the Oshawa Museum).

In 2010, the Ontario Heritage Trust's Premier Gravesites Program placed a bronze/granite plaque and a Provincial flag outside the Mausoleum at Oshawa's Union Cemetery, where Conant is interred.

See also

 Mitchell Hepburn#Resignation

References

External links
 
 

1885 births
1953 deaths
Conant family
Attorneys General of Ontario
Leaders of the Ontario Liberal Party
Mayors of Oshawa
Lawyers in Ontario
Canadian King's Counsel
Members of the United Church of Canada
Premiers of Ontario
University of Toronto alumni